Bernadette Karpf (born 3 July 1996) is a German ice hockey player and member of the German national team, currently playing in the Swedish Women's Hockey League (SDHL) with Leksands IF Dam.

She participated at the 2015 IIHF Women's World Championship.

References

External links

1996 births
Living people
German expatriate ice hockey people
German expatriate sportspeople in Sweden
German ice hockey centres
German women's ice hockey forwards
Leksands IF Dam players
Sportspeople from Landshut